The 2009 Al-Nasr International Tournament is a friendly football tournament that takes place in Dubai in the United Arab Emirates.

Participant teams

Semifinals

Third place Match

Final

Champion

External links
goalzz.com

Al-nasr International Tournament, 2009
Emirati football friendly trophies
Aln